is a passenger railway station located in the city of Kumagaya, Saitama, Japan, operated by the private railway operator Chichibu Railway.

Lines

Station layout
The station is staffed and consists of a single island platform serving two tracks. A bidirectional freight loop and an additional siding lie to the south of the platform tracks.

Platforms

Adjacent stations

History
Ōasō Station opened on 7 October 1901.

Passenger statistics
In fiscal 2018, the station was used by an average of 235 passengers daily.

Surrounding area
 Hirosegawara Depot
 Arakawa River
 Arakara Ōasō Wild Bird Park
 National Route 140

See also
 List of railway stations in Japan

References

External links

 Ōasō Station information (Saitama Prefectural Government) 
 Ōasō Station timetable 

Railway stations in Saitama Prefecture
Railway stations in Japan opened in 1901
Railway stations in Kumagaya